Doval is a surname. Notable people with the surname include:

Ajit Doval (born 1945), Indian intelligence official
Camilo Doval (born 1997), Dominican baseball relief pitcher for the San Francisco Giants
Fernanda Doval (born 1975), Brazilian volleyball player
Fernando Rodríguez Doval (born 1980), Mexican politician
Juan de Dios Doval Mateo (1943-1980), Spanish politician and law professor
Narciso Horacio Doval (1944-1991), Argentine footballer